Derbent is a city in the Republic of Dagestan, Russia.

Derbent may also refer to:

Places

Russia
 Derbent Urban Okrug, a municipal formation which the City of Derbent in the Republic of Dagestan, Russia is incorporated as
 Derbent Khanate, a historical khanate centered in the city of Derbent,

Turkey
 Derbent, Bartın, a village in the Bartın Province
 Derbent, Bismil, a village in the Diyarbakır Province
 Derbent, Bayat, a village in the Afyonkarahisar Province
 Derbent, Buldan, a village in the Denizli Province
 Derbent, Konya, a district center and town in the Konya Province
 Derbent Dam, a dam on the Kızılırmak River in Samsun Province

Elsewhere
 Derventa, a town and municipality of Bosnia and Herzegovina

Other uses
 FC Derbent, a defunct association football club from Derbent, Russia
 Tanker "Derbent", a novel by Yury Krymov, made into a Soviet movie

See also
 Derbentsky District, a district in the Republic of Dagestan, Russia
 Derbentobruğu, Gümüşhacıköy, a village in the Amasya Province, Turkey
 Derbendcis, Ottoman military auxiliary constabulary units
 Iron Gate (Central Asia), a defile between Balkh and Samarkand